Olivér Pittner (1911–1971) was a Hungarian painter.

References 

1911 births
1971 deaths
20th-century Hungarian painters
Hungarian male painters
20th-century Hungarian male artists